The men's madison competition at the 2021 UEC European Track Championships was held on 9 October 2021.

Results
200 laps (50 km) with 20 sprints were raced.

References

Men's madison
European Track Championships – Men's madison